This is a list of Member of the Order of the British Empire (OBE) awards in the 1918 Birthday Honours.

The 1918 Birthday Honours were appointments by King George V to various orders and honours to reward and highlight good works by citizens of the British Empire. The appointments were made to celebrate the official birthday of The King, and were published in The London Gazette in early June 1918. 

The recipients of honours are displayed here as they were styled before their new honour, and arranged by honour, with classes (Knight, Knight Grand Cross, etc.) and then divisions (Military, Civil, etc.) as appropriate.

Officer of the Order of the British Empire (OBE) awards

Captain Arthur Cecil Abrahams — Deputy Director of Stores, Boulogne, British Red Cross Commission, France
John Hilling Absale — Late Principal of the Securities Office, Bank of England
Commander Albert Edward Acheson  Divisional Naval Transport Officer, Manchester
Ellen Marion Acton — Assistant Secretary, The Incorporated Soldiers and Sailors Help Society
Lieutenant-Commander Frank Ezra Adcock  Naval Intelligence Division, Admiralty
Lieutenant-Colonel John Kellerman Adey — Deputy Assistant Director of Medical Services, Australian Imperial Force Depots
Charles Morland Agnew, Wounded and Missing Enquiry Department, British Red Cross Society
Commander Samuel Montagu Agnew 
James Herbert Aitken — Acting Assistant Director of Stores, Admiralty
Major John Camille Akerman — Assistant Director of Propaganda and Housing, Department of the Controller-General for Merchant Shipbuilding, Admiralty
Frederick Alexander  — Commandant, Motor Ambulance Convoy No. 3, British Red Cross Commission, Italy
James Allan  Assistant County Director, Kent, British Red Cross Society
Captain William McDiarmid Allardice — Inspector, Small Arms, Birmingham Area, Ministry of Munitions
Clementina Dorothy Allen — Assistant County Director and Honorary Secretary, Gloucestershire, British Red Cross and Order of St. John of Jerusalem
Walter Macarthur Allen — Director of Supplies, Metropolitan Special Constabulary
Richard John Allison — Principal Architect, HM Office of Works
Justin Charles William Alvarez  Censor of Turkish Correspondence, Malta
Arthur Anderson  — Commandant and Organiser of Motor Ambulance Transport, West Riding Division, British Red Cross and Order of St. John of Jerusalem
Major Charles Henry Anderson — For services with the British Expeditionary Force in France
Dora Anderson—Administrator, Red Cross Stores, Southampton Docks
Eric Harper Anderson — Technical Adviser, Fish Section, Restriction of Enemy Supplies Department
William Anderson — Chairman  of the Glasgow Central Advisory Committee
Beatrice Mary Apthorp — Commandant of the Technical Institute Auxiliary Hospital, Maidenhead
Commander Francis Philip Armstrong  Auxiliary Patrol
Major William Herbert Arscott — For services with the British Expeditionary Force in France
Lieutenant-Colonel Reginald Godfrey Aston — Officer in Charge of Military Camp Railways
Charles Gurney Atha — Managing Director, The Frodingham Iron and Steel Co., Ltd.
Georgina Jane Atkinson — Honorary Secretary, North Riding of Yorkshire County Association of Voluntary Workers
Edward Lewis Attwood — Chief Constructor, Department of Director of Naval Construction, Admiralty
Major Henry Joseph Francis Audus — For services with the British Expeditionary Force in France
Captain James Waters Earnscliffe Avern — Section Director, Labour Department, Ministry of Munitions
Captain James Carol Badger — Master, Mercantile Marine
Kavas Jamas Badshah — Honorary Secretary, Ipswich War Savings Committee
Duncan Bailey — Managing Director, Messrs, Charles Roberts and Co., Ltd.
Brevet Lieutenant-Colonel John Henry Bailey — Deputy Assistant Director of Fortifications and Works, War Office
Granville Hugh Baillie  Chief Technical Adviser on Dilution of Labour Ministry of Munitions
Major Clive Latham Baillieu — For services with the British Expeditionary Force in France
George Baker — Director, Messrs. John Baker & Co. (Rotherham), Limited
Captain Richard Lawrence Baker — Design Department, Ministry of Munitions
Charles John Balaam — Acting Divisional Officer for London and South-Eastern Division, Employment Department, Ministry of Labour
Captain Walter Burton Burton-Baldry — Ministry of National Service
Edmund Chaplin Baldwin — Honorary Secretary, Sussex County Association of Voluntary Workers
Lucy Baldwin — Commandant and Donor, Wilden Auxiliary Hospital, Stourport
William Valentine Ball — Civil Liabilities Commissioner for the County of Essex
Archibald Hamilton Balme— Wool Technical Officer, War Office; Member of the Raw Wool Advisory Committee
Lieutenant-Colonel Harry William Morrey Bamford  South African Infantry
Richard Banfield — Acting Chief Constable of Cornwall
Anna Edwards Barbour— Benefactress, Hilden Convalescent Hospital for Soldiers, Belfast
Major Robert Leatham Barclay — Inspector of Quarter Master-General's Services
Major The Hon. Maurice Baring — Staff Officer, 2nd Class, Royal Air Force
Thomas Cooke Barkas  Acting Deputy Commissioner of Medical Services, Ministry of National Service, Northern Region
Major Arthur John Chichester Barnard — For services with the British Expeditionary Force in France
Katherine Weston Barnardiston — Head of Records Department, Central Prisoners' of War Committee, British Red Cross Society
Lieutenant-Colonel Frank Purcell Barnes — For services with the British Expeditionary Force in France
James Burden Barnes — Inspector of Medical Supplies, War Office
Major George Barnsley — Assistant Director- of Recruiting, Sheffield
Captain Frank Sowter Barnwell— Aeroplane Designer, The British and Colonial Aeroplane Co., Ltd.
Geoffrey Foster Barrett — Director, The Hoffmann Manufacturing Co., Ltd.
Lieutenant-Colonel Bernard John Wolfe-Barry — Staff Officer, 1st Class, Royal Air Force
David Barry — General Manager, British and Irish Steam Packet Co., Ltd.
John Bartholomew — Civil Liabilities Commissioner for Glasgow
Emma Slice Barton — Administrator, Stapleton Auxiliary Hospital, Pontefract
H G. Barwell — Superintendent, Eastern Telegraph Company, Malta
Herbert Bates — Managing Director, Messrs. Hulse & Co., Ltd.
William Bates — of the firm of Messrs. Rea, Coaling Agents
Roland Bayley — Assistant Director of Oils and Fats, Ministry of Food and Ministry of Munitions
Violet Marie Louise, Baroness Beaumont — Donor and Commandant, Officers' Auxiliary Hospital, Slindon House, Arundel, Sussex
Ivy Nina Beckett
Captain Charles Glynn Hughes Bellamy — For services with the British Expeditionary Force in France
Colonel John William Beningfield  Commandant, City of London Special Constabulary
Reginald Allbon Bennett— Superintending Aliens Officer, Cardiff
William John Benson — Section Director, Ministry of Munitions
Major John Anstruther Berners — Voluntary work in connection with recruiting
Major Egerton Mitford Bettington — For services with the British Expeditionary Force in France
Robert Bilsland  Chairman, West Suffolk War Agricultural Executive Committee
Major Basil Binyon — Royal Air Force
Major James Bird — Royal Air Force
Captain James Webb Bispham — For services with the British Expeditionary Force in France
Captain Edward Richard Blackburne — For services with the British Expeditionary Force in France
Acting Fleet Paymaster Leonard Blackler  Secretary to Principal Naval Transport Officer in France
Thomas Blacklock — Chief Engineer, Mercantile Marine
John Frank Blackshaw— Superintending Inspector, Dairy Branch, Board of Agriculture and Fisheries
Harry Blake — Senior Partner, Messrs. Hogg and Robinson, Admiralty Shipping Agents
Sir John George Blaker  National Service Representative
Herbert John George Blandford — Warship Production Superintendent, Department of Director of Warship Production, Admiralty
Marie Lucienne Henriette Adine, Baroness de Blaquiere — Vice-President, Bath District, British Red Cross and Order of St. John of Jerusalem; Organiser, Lansdown Place Auxiliary Hospital, Bath.
Commander James Bloomfield  Auxiliary Shipbuilding Department, Admiralty
Lieutenant-Colonel Edward Augustine Blount — For services with the British Expeditionary Force in France
Major Bryan Seymour Moss-Blundell  For services with the British Expeditionary Force in France
William Henry Boar —  Accountant-General's Department, Admiralty
William John Board — Town Clerk, Nottingham
John Bond — Engineer, the Southport Gas Company; Inspector for Gas Section, Explosives Supply Department, Ministry of Munitions
John Robert Bond — Assistant Director, Shipyard Labour Department, Admiralty
Captain Erskine Booth — Assistant Director of Vegetable Supplies, Ministry of Food
Mary Booth Booth — Staff Captain, Salvation Army. 
Walter Borrie — Managing Director, Messrs. Blair and Co., Ltd., Stockton-on-Tees
Percy George Hamnall Boswell  Professor of Geology, Liverpool University; Geological Adviser to Ministry of Munitions
Thomas Stanley Bower — Organiser and Officer in Charge, Auxiliary Hospital, Frodsham, Cheshire
Godfrey Hale Boyce — Honorary Solicitor, Soldiers' and Sailors' Families' Association
Robert Alexander Stewart Boyton — Inspector of Fuzes, Cartridge Cases and Complete Rounds, Canada, Ministry of Munitions
Major William Percy Bradbury — For services with the British Expeditionary Force in France
William Bradford  General Financial Secretary, National Flint Glass Makers' Society of Great Britain and Ireland
Fleet Surgeon Frank Bradshaw  President of a Recruiting Medical Board
Granville Eastwood Bradshaw  —  Messrs. Walton Motors, Limited
Major Ernest Edward Peel Bramall — For services with the Egyptian Expeditionary Force
Lieutenant-Colonel Robert Harvey Brand — Assistant Controller of Supplies in Directorate of Aircraft Equipment, Royal Air Force
Lieutenant-Colonel The Hon. Maurice Vyner Baliol Brett  For services with the British Expeditionary Force in France
Lieutenant-Colonel Gordon Leslie Broad  Assistant Director of Army Signals, Home Forces
Captain Francis Broadwood— National Service Representative
Marie Frances Lisette, Baroness Willoughby de Broke — Vice-President, Kineton Division, British Red Cross and Order of St. John of Jerusalem; Joint Commandant — Kineton Auxiliary Hospital, Warwickshire
Edward Geoffrey de Capell Brooke  —  Private Secretary to the Chief of the Imperial General Staff
Lieutenant-Colonel Orlando Frank Brothers —  British Columbia Regiment
Alice Brown — Lady Superintendent, Young Men’s Christian Association. Hostel for Relatives of Wounded, Camiers
Archibald Hall Brown — Deputy Controller, Gun Supply Department, Ministry of Munitions
Lady Isabel Mary Peyronnet Browne —  Wounded and Missing Enquiry Department, British Red Cross Society, London
Lieutenant-Colonel Philip Henry Browne — Assistant Director, Inland Water Transport, Mesopotamia
Lieutenant-Colonel Alexander Bruce  —  Army Medical Department, War Office
Captain Edward Walrond de Wells Bruce — Master of the Hospital Ship Plassy.
William Joseph Willett Bruce— Superintending Engineer, Mercantile Marine
John Norman Brunton — Head of Merchant Tonnage Section, Director of Statistics Department, Admiralty
Major George Herbert Bryant  — For services with the British Expeditionary Force in France
Major Edward John Buckley — For services with the British Expeditionary Force in France
Georgiana Essie Budgett — Honorary Secretary, Bristol Branch, British Red Cross Society
William Huntley Buist  — Senior Magistrate of Dundee; Chairman of the Dundee War Savings Committee
Charles Henry Bulleid — Manager at a National Shell Factory
Captain William Henry Chambers Bullen — Principal Assistant, Controlled Establishments Division, Ministry of Munitions
Marion Maria Bulloch — County Director, Perthshire, Scottish Branch, British Red Cross Society
Colonel William Edward Burgess — Senior National Service Representative, Bristol
Lieutenant-Colonel Newdigate Addington Knightley Burne — For services with the British Expeditionary Force in France
Sarah Elizabeth Burnet — Assistant Chief of Section at the Central Office, Ministry of Labour
William Beckit Burnie  — Brighton War Pensions Committee and Brighton Technical Institute
The Rev. Canon Harry Darwin Burton — Principal Chaplain, New Zealand Expeditionary Force
Frank Bushrod — Assistant Superintendent of the Line, London and South-Western Railway
Samuel Foster Butcher —  Bury War Pensions Local Committee
Albert Butler — Principal Clerk (in charge of Accounts), Royal Arsenal, Woolwich
Harold George Butler — Chairman, Blacklist Committee, War Trade Department
Major Jabez Butterworth —  Army Pay Department
Ethel Buxton — Joint Commandant, Theydon Towers Auxiliary Hospital, Theydon Bois, Essex
The Hon. Mary Emma Buxton — The Lady Lugard Belgian Hospitality Committee
Major Roland Martin Byne —  Royal Marine Light Infantry
Charles Reginald Byrom — Assistant to the Superintendent of the Line, London and North-Western Railway
Captain Henry Leon Cabuche — Assistant Controller, Department of Engineering, Ministry of Munitions
The Rev. David Smith Cairns  Young Men’s Christian Association. — Worker in France and Great Britain
James Charles Calder —  Timber Supplies Department, Board of Trade
Lieutenant-Colonel Michael Alexander Caldwell — For services with the British Expeditionary Force in France
Joseph Callan —  District Secretary, Young Men’s Christian Association, Rouen
Louisa Mary Calverley — Vice-President, Harlow Division, Essex Branch, British Red Cross Society
Acting Commander Donald Campbell — Port Coaling Officer
Mary Vereker Hamilton-Campbell — Head of the Voluntary Organisations Depot, Ayr
Lieutenant -Commander Victor Ribeiro d'Almeida Campos  — Master of the Cableship Colonia
Major Charles George du Cane — For services with the British Expeditionary Force in France
Captain Edwin Galton Cannons — Master, Mercantile Marine
Alexander Cargill  — Member of the Scottish War Savings Committee
Charles Howard Carpenter —  Voluntary Worker in the Department of the Director-General of Voluntary Organisations
Alexander Carr
Reginald Childers Culling Carr — Deputy Director of the Enforcement Branch, Ministry of Food
Flora Mactavish Carter — Honorary Secretary, Aberdeen City Association of Voluntary Workers
Herbert Parkinson Carter — Chairman, Lincoln (Holland Division) War Agricultural Executive Committee
Reginald Ormsby Cary — Director and General Manager, The Sopwith Aviation Co., Ltd.
Albert Cathles — Assistant Controller, Factory Audit and Costs, Ministry of Munitions
Beatrice Julia Cave — Vice-President, Lawford's Gate Division, British Red Cross and Order of St. John of Jerusalem; Commandant, deye Hill Auxiliary Hospital, Gloucestershire
The Hon. Elizabeth Janet Cavendish — Vice-President, North Huntingdonshire, British Red Cross and Order of St. John of Jerusalem; Commandant and Administrator, Whitehall Auxiliary Hospital, Sawtry, Huntingdonshire
Harold Richards Chaldecott — Manager, Elswick Shipbuilding Yard, Newcastle
Helen Chamberlain — Assistant County Director, Birmingham, British Red Cross and Order of St. John of Jerusalem
Frank William Chambers — County Secretary for War Savings in Gloucestershire
Lieutenant-Colonel John Adrian Chamier  Officer Commanding, School of Instruction, Royal Air Force
Lieutenant-Colonel Reginald Spencer Chaplin —  British Remount Commission, Canada
Captain Edward Henry Chapman — For services with the British Expeditionary Force in France
Rowland Hugh Charlton — Chairman  and Managing Director, Messrs. Charlton & Co., Engineers, Grimsby
Elinor Mary Charrington — Vice-President, Burton Division, British Red Cross and Order of St. John of Jerusalem; Commandant, Burton Auxiliary Hospital, Staffordshire
Major William Charles Chassar — Australian Imperial Forces
Eva Christine Cheetham — Commandant, Cawston Manor Auxiliary Hospital, Norwich
Captain Henry Francis Chettle —  Registrar, Graves Registration and Enquiries
Edwin Albert Chill  Assistant County Director, Central Division, Middlesex, British Red Cross and Order of St. John of Jerusalem
Robert Francis Cholmeley — Joint Honorary Secretary of the Incorporated Association of Headmasters
Lieutenant-Colonel Mervyn Lyde Chute — For services with the British Expeditionary Force in France
Major Douglas Clapham — Inspector, Proof Officer, U.S.A., Ministry of Munitions
Captain Frank Henry Claret — Master, Mercantile Marine
Captain Frederick Ourry Clark — Master, Mercantile Marine
Colonel John de Winton Lardner-Clarke —  First Assistant to the Chief Executive Officer of the Cable Censorship
Major Ernest Charles Clay — Deputy Assistant Adjutant-General, War Office
Major William Henry Christy Clay — Deputy Chief Valuer and Compensation Officer, War Office
Ella Elizabeth Clipperton —  Directress of British Red Cross Stores Rouen
Mary Knight Clowes — Organiser, Young Women's Christian Association. Munition Canteens
Major Thomas Seymour Coates — For services with the British Expeditionary Force in France
Lieutenant-Colonel Henry Frederick Cobb — Chief Valuer and Compensation Officer, Lands Division, War Office and Ministry ol Munitions
Major David Cockburn  Secretary, Territorial Force Association of the County of Dumbarton
Major Ernest Radcliffe Cockburn — Secretary to the Territorial Force Association of the County of Ayr
Major George Ernest Cockburn — Assistant Director of Engineering Work, Department of the Controller-General for Merchant Shipbuilding, Admiralty
Major Anthony Stuart Buckland-Cockell  For services with the British Expeditionary Force in France
Major Basil Elmsley Coke — For services with the British Expeditionary Force in France
Colonel George Henry Coleman  County Secretary, Essex Branch, British Red Cross Society
Captain Patrick Eugene Coleman — For services with the British Expeditionary Force in France
Charles Benjamin Collett —  Locomotive Works Manager, Great Northern Railway
Colonel Henry Concannon  Director, White Star Line
Captain Raymond Henry Coope — Master, Mercantile Marine
Major Vivian Bolton Douglas Cooper — For services with the British Expeditionary Force in France
William Alexander Coote — Secretary, National Vigilance Association
Sybel Corbett — Deputy President, Caerphilly Division, British Red Cross and Order of St. John of Jerusalem; Commandant, Auxiliary Hospital, Caerphilly
William Delhi Cornish  Voluntary work in connection with recruiting
James Cosgrove — Chief Engineer, Mercantile Marine
Mabel Cotterell — Chief Lady Welfare Supervisor at one of HM Factories, Ministry of Munitions
Major Frederick Coulon — For services with the British Expeditionary Force, in France
John Charles Couper — Chief National Service Representative, Edinburgh
Alfred Cox  Secretary, Central Medical War Committee
Irene Winifred Cox — General Secretary, Young Women's Christian Association
Richard Andrew Crafter —  Harbour Master, Mersey Docks and Harbour Board, Liverpool
Eustace Neville Craig —  Voluntary services in connection with recruiting
William Craig — County Clerk of Dumbartonshire; Clerk to the Local Tribunal
John Crisp — Divisional Commander, Metropolitan Special Constabulary
George Crammond Croal — Chief Engineer, Mercantile Marine
Major Crofton Croker — For services with the British Expeditionary Force in France
William Montgomery Crook  — Collections Department, Joint War Committee, British Red Cross and Order of St John of Jerusalem
Captain Alwyn Douglas Crow —  Research Department, Woolwich
Edith Frances Crowdy — Deputy Director; Women's Royal Naval Service
Isabel Crowdy — Commandant of Voluntary Aid Detachment Area, British-Red Cross Commission, France
William John Cruddas — Section Director, Aircraft Production-Department, Ministry of Munitions
Alexander Thomas Cruickshank — Chairman  of the Aberdeen Central War Savings Committee
Edith Bruce Culver —  Divisional Secretary, British Red Cross-Society, Kent
Alexander Charles Cumming  Director, The Lothian Chemical Co., Ltd.; Manager at one of HM Factories, Ministry of Munitions
Barbara Martin Cunningham  Military Hospital, Mtarfa, Malta
James William Curry — Deputy Controller of Supplies, HM Office of Works
Major Sydney Herbert George Dainton — Assistant Director, Postal Services, British Expeditionary Force, France.
Major Alwyn Percy Dale — For an act of gallantry not in the presence of the enemy
Lieutenant-Colonel James William Ogilvy-Dalgleish — Assistant in the Directorate of Air Personal Services, Air Ministry
Lieutenant-Colonel Joseph Dalrymple — For services with the British Expeditionary Force in France
Norman Pearson Dalziel — Assistant to Chief Inspector of Munitions, Canada, Ministry of Munitions
Colonel Thomas Edward St. Clare Daniell  Deputy Director of Aircraft Equipment, Royal Air Force
Major William Hastings la Touche Darley  — For services with the British Expeditionary Force in France
Colonel Edward Humphrey Davidson  Deputy Director of Air Intelligence, Royal Air Force
Lieutenant-Colonel Charles Robert Davies  —  Permanent President of Courts-Martial, Australian Imperial Force
Ethel Price-Davies — Vice-President, County of Montgomery Branch, British Red Cross Society
Richard Davies  Chairman, Executive Committee, City of London Branch, British Red Cross Society
Thomas Evan Davies — Section Director, Railway Materials Department, Ministry of Munitions
Captain William Henry Saxon Davies — Deputy Director, Motor Transport, Boulogne, British Red Cross Commission, France
Lieutenant Sidney George Davis  —  Registration Department, Ministry of National Service
Lilla Davy — Area Controller, Queen Mary's Army Auxiliary Corps
Sybil Mary Dawnay — Honorary Secretary, Northamptonshire County Association of Voluntary Workers
Arthur James Dawson — Clerk to the County of Durham Education Committee
Minnie Ethel, Lady Dawson — Yarrow Military Hospital, Broadstairs
Major Edmund Day —  Embarkation Veterinary Officer, Southampton
Norris Henry Deakin — Secretary, Sheffield Employers' Federation
Augusta Deane — Senior Organising Officer for Women's Work, South-Western Division, Ministry of Labour
Major William Delany — For services with the British Expeditionary Force in France
Arthur Christopher Denham — Section Director. Priority Department, Ministry of Munitions
Lieutenant-Colonel Bertram Ramsey Dennis  For services with the British Expeditionary Force in France
Beatrice Lorne Despard — Honorary Superintendent and Convener of the County of Lanarkshire War Work Association; Commandant, Caldegrove Auxiliary Hospital
Edward Dexter — Honorary Secretary, City of London War Savings Committee
Thomas Edward Dexter —  Expense Accounts Officer, Devonport Dockyard
Isabel Anne Dickson —  HM Inspector of Schools; Food Production Department, Board of Agriculture
Norman Dickson — Member of the Priority Committee, Ministry of Munitions
Arthur Diggins — Senior Clerk, Exchequer and Audit Department
Edmund Grattan Dignam  —  Commission Internationale de Ravitaillement
Lieutenant-Colonel John Francis Dimmer —  Royal Marine Light Infantry
Beatrice, Dowager Lady Dimsdale — Commandant, Fishmongers' Hall Auxiliary Hospital for Officers
Edward Dixon —  Messrs. Firth & Son, Ltd., Sheffield
Leonard Alexander Dixon — General Secretary, Young Men’s Christian Association, Mesopotamian Expeditionary Force
Thomas Liddell Dodds  Chairman, Birkenhead Local Tribunal
Sir Matthew Blayney Smith-Dodsworth  Chairman of the Yorkshire Division, Young Men’s Christian Association.
Robinson Irving Dodsworth — Head of Steamship Management Department, Messrs. Furness, Withy & Co. (London)
Captain Herbert Edward Dolton — Master, Mercantile Marine
Bedford Lockwood Dorman — Directorate of Artillery, War Office
Alfred Douglas —  Accountant-General's Department, Admiralty
Captain James Bernard Harvey Doyle — For services with the British Expeditionary Force in France
Katharine Rosebery Drinkwater  In charge of Military Families' Hospital Staff and Department, Malta
Reginald Ernest Druitt —  Greek Shipping Committee
Captain Robert Drummond  Chairman of Paisley Local Tribunal
Geoffrey Herbert Drury —  Mobilisation Directorate, War Office
Major John Douglas Drysdale — For services with the British Expeditionary Force in France
Maud Violet Dugdale  — Commandant, Yarm Auxiliary Hospital, Yorkshire
James Duncan  — National Service Representative, Brechin District, Forfarshire
Major Charles Dunlop — For service in Russia
The Rev. George Victor Dunnett  —  Temporary Chaplain to the Forces, 4th Class
Captain Percy Dunsheath — For services with the British Expeditionary Force in France
Philip Barton Durnford — Secretary, Expeditionary Force Canteens
Frank George Edmed — Principal Assistant Chemist, Inspection Department, Ministry of Munitions
John Edwards — Manager, Messrs. Hick, Hargreaves & Co., Ltd.
Major William Bickerton Edwards  Commissioner for Medical Services for Ministry of National Service, Welsh Region
William Rea Edwards — Headquarters Secretary, Order of St. John of Jerusalem
George Egan  — Cashier,  HM Dockyard, Portsmouth
Frank Minshull Elgood  — Church Army Commissioner for an Army Area in France; Chairman of the Military Standing Committee, Church Army
Colonel Arthur Warre Elles — For services in connection with recruiting
Samuel Ellicock —  HM Inspector of Schools; Honorary Secretary, Leicestershire War Savings Committee
James Valentine Ellis — Commercial and General Manager, The Workington Iron and Steel Co., Ltd.
Elisha Elwood— Superintending Inspector of Taxes, Inland Revenue Department
Frederick William Emett — Director, Intelligence Bureau, Reuter's
Lawrence Ennis — General Manager, Messrs. Dorman, Long & Co., Ltd.
Captain Henry Morton Glyn Evans — Sub-Commissioner for Trade Exemptions, Ministry of National Service, Welsh Region
Herbert Walter Lloyd Evans — Assistant Superintendent, Operative Department, Royal Mint
Richard Evans — Chairman, Cardiganshire War Agricultural Executive Committee
Gwendolen Evelyn Maud Evelyn — Commandant, No. 6 Auxiliary Hospital, Radnor
Captain Ernest Andrew Ewart  —  Propaganda Branch, Aircraft Production Department, Ministry of Munitions
John Eyre — Honorary Secretary, Buckinghamshire Branch, British Red Cross Society
Oscar Faber  Messrs. Trollope & Colls,
William Fairbank  Organiser and Instructor in Ambulance Work in the Windsor District, British Red Cross and Order of St. John of Jerusalem
Samuel William Farmer  Member of the President of the Board of Agriculture's Advisory Committee on Food Production
Alfred William Farnsworth — Secretary and General Manager, Derbyshire Munitions Board of Management
Thomas Fender — Works Superintendent, Messrs. Vickers, Ltd., Barrow
William Henry Ffiske — Managing Director, Messrs. Boulton and Paul, Limited
Herbert Stanley Field — Chief Dilution Officer, Yorkshire and East Midlands Division, Ministry of Munitions
Joseph Henry Field — Town Clerk, Huddersfield
The Hon. Florence Agnes, Lady Fiennes — Commandant and Donor, Studland Bay Hospital for Officers, Dorsetshire
Lieutenant-Commander William Finch  Master, Mercantile Marine
Lieutenant-Colonel Frank Dalzell Finlay — For services, with the British Expeditionary Force in France
Captain Duncan Finlayson — Chief Constable of the County of Ross and Cromarty
Arthur Percy Morris Fleming —  Engineer, British Westinghouse Company; Honorary Secretary, Lancashire Anti-Submarine Committee
Lieutenant-Colonel John Grant Fleming  National Service Representative, Banffshire
Frank Purser Fletcher —  Electrical Engineer, Department of Director of Electrical Engineering, Admiralty
John Smith Flett  Assistant to the Director of the Geological Survey of Great Britain
Leila Beatrice Flower —  Clerk in the Prime Minister's Secretariat
Allen Edward Ford — Section Director, Aircraft Finance Department, Ministry of Munitions
Major Edward Thomas Forsdick — For services with the British Expeditionary Force in France
George Frederick Forsdike — Chairman, Cardiff Local Tribunal
Lieutenant-Commander John Vernon Forster  Marine Superintendent, Canadian Pacific Ocean Services, Limited
Major John Vere Foster — For services with the British Expeditionary Force, Salonika
Captain Ralph Howard Fowler —  Munitions Inventions Department
Robert Copp Fowler —  Casualty Section, War Office
Herbert William Sidney Francis  —  First Class Clerk, Local Government Board
George Ernest Franey — Personal Secretary to the Secretary of State for India during his tour in India
Captain Francis Arthur Freeth —  Chemist, Messrs. Brunner Mond and Co., Ltd.
Guy Carey Fricker — Managing Director, Fricker's Metal Co., Ltd.
Beatrice Fry —  The Training Ship Mercury
Theodore Wilfrid Fry — Civil Liabilities Commissioner for the County of Durham
Mabel Fuller — Commandant, Auxiliary Hospital, Melksham, Wiltshire
Commander Gerard Knipe Gandy  Master, Mercantile Marine
Major Henry George Gandy  Brigade Major and Secretary, School of Military Engineering
Robert Dowell Ganson  Convener of the County of Shetland; Member of the Appeal Tribunal of the Sheriffdom
Commander Peter Bruff Garrett  Divisional Naval Transport Officer, Newhaven
Holbrook Gaskell — Chief Engineer, the United Alkali Company, Ltd.
Captain Thomas Frank Gates — Commodore Master, Mercantile Marine
Captain Vernon Rodney Montagu Gattie — Prisoners of War Directorate, War Office
Lina Mary Scott Gatty — Honorary Secretary, Huntingdonshire County Association of Voluntary Workers
Walter Henry Gaunt — Domestic Distribution Branch, Coal Mines Department, Board of Trade
Captain John George — Master, Mercantile Marine
Herbert Mends Gibson  Chief Superintendent, Manchester Ship Canal Company
Captain Richard Edward Gibson — For services with the British Expeditionary Force in France
John MacAuslan Gilchrist — Manager, Repairing Works, Messrs. Barclay Curie-and Co., Ltd., Whiteinch
Charles John Gladwell —  Late Head of the Commercial Section, War Trade Intelligence Department
Herbert Glaser — Section Director, Aircraft Production Department, Ministry of Munitions
Lieutenant-Colonel Thomas George Powell Glynn  For services with the British Expeditionary Force in France
Francis Edward Gobey —  Wagon and Carriage Superintendent, Lancashire and Yorkshire Railway
Major Charles Ernest Goddard  President of a Recruiting Medical Board
Lieutenant-Colonel John Charles Lerrier Godfray  For services with the British Expeditionary Force in France
Lieutenant-Colonel Harcourt Gilbey Gold — Staff Officer, 1st Class, Royal Air Force
James Scott Gordon — Deputy Assistant Secretary and Chief Inspector, Department of Agriculture and Technical Instruction for Ireland
James Tennant Gordon — Chief Constable of Fifeshire
Captain Ronald Gorell, Baron Gorell  For services with the British Expeditionary Force in France
Major William Henry Neville Goschen— National Service Representative
Violet Alice Gott — Vice-President, Alton Division, British Red Cross and Order of St. John of Jerusalem, and Commandant, Alton Auxiliary Hospital, Hampshire
Thomas Harkness Graham — Secretary, Scottish Medical War Emergency Committee
Captain Dennis Granville  Chief Constable of Dorset
Edward Douglas Grasett —  Outdoor Traffic Superintendent, North Staffordshire Railway
Major Frederick Grassick — Australian Army Pay Corps
Major Cecil Alexander Hope Graves — For services with the British Expeditionary Force in France
James Carter Gray —  Personal Assistant to' Council Member "M," Ministry of Munitions'
Ethel Mary Green — Vice-President and Commandant, Nunthorpe Hall Auxiliary Hospital, York
Major John Green — For services with the British Expeditionary Force in France
John Little Green — Secretary of the Rural League
Major Charles Okey Greenwell — For services with the British Expeditionary Force in France
Captain Alured Ussher Greer — Assistant Controller, Salvage Department, Ministry of Munitions
Lieutenant-Colonel Alfred Gregory — Senior Technical Examiner of Works Services, War Office
Lieutenant-Commander Nigel de Grey  Naval Intelligence Division, Admiralty
Lady Sybil Grey — Commandant, Dorchester House Hospital for Officers; late Commandant of Anglo-Russian Hospital, Petrograd
Major Richard Albany Grieve — For services with the British Expeditionary Force in France
Lieutenant-Colonel William Ernest Grigor — Australian Army Medical Corps
Lieutenant-Colonel Basil Jasper Gripper  Secretary, Territorial Force Association of the County of Hertford
Frank Grove — Inspector of Munitions Areas, Manchester, Ministry of Munitions
Samuel Percy Grundy — General Secretary, Manchester City League of Help; Honorary Secretary, Manchester War Savings Committee
Charles John Tench Bedford Grylls  Committee Clerk, Board of Customs and Excise
Sir William Cameron Gull  National Service Representative
Lieutenant-Colonel John Alexander Gunn — For services with the British Expeditionary Force in France
Engineer Commander Arthur Sydney Gush 
Edith Moore-Gwyn — Commandant, "The Laurels" Auxiliary Hospital, Neath
John Thomas Augustus Haines — Postal Censor's Department
William Joseph Haines —  Lieutenant-Colonel, Salvation Army
Annie Hall — Commandant, Eastcote Auxiliary Hospital, Middlesex
Charles John Ernest Hall — Assistant County Director, Auxiliary Hospitals and Voluntary Aid Detachments, Cheshire
Frederick Walter Hall — Chairman, Survey Committee, Yorkshire (North Riding) War Agricultural Executive Committee
Major Herbert Gordon Lewis Hall — For services with the British Expeditionary Force in France
Martin Julian Hall —  Late Section Director, Gun Statistics Department, Ministry of Munitions
Frederic Greville Hallett — Secretary, Committee of Reference, Ministry of National Service
Captain John Molyneux Hamill — For services with the British Expeditionary Force in France
 — Member of Bacon Board, Ministry of Food
Effield Dorothy Cecil Hanbury — Vice-President, Hospital Supply Depot, British Red Cross Society, Dorchester
Captain Charles Frederick Hancock — Master, Mercantile Marine
Harry George Handover  Mayor of Paddington
William Joseph Hands — Acting Deputy Director-General of National Labour Supply
John Miller-Hannah  Chairman of the Ayrshire Food Production Committee; Member of the Ayrshire Appeal Tribunal
Major John Richard Hanson —  Army Pay Department
Lieutenant-Colonel Paul Rennard Hanson — Officer in charge of Canadian Discharge Depot, Buxton
Staff Surgeon Reginald John Edward Hanson 
Egerton Stephen Somers Harding — Founder and Manager of the Catholic Club, France
Major William Frederick James Hardisty — Secretary, Territorial Force Association of the County of Warwick
Frances May Holford Hardman — Commandant, Castle Auxiliary Hospital, Sherborne
Edward Harker —  His Britannic Majesty's Consul, Valencia
David Harley — Provost  of the Burgh of Dunfermline
Captain Arthur David Harper — Assistant Secretary, Ministry of National Service, North-Western Region
John Bradford Harper — Assistant General Superintendent, North Eastern Railway
Herbert Frederick Harries —  Late Acting Chief Constable, Shrewsbury Borough Police
Lieutenant-Commander George Henry Harris  Master, Mercantile Marine
George Montagu Harris — Acting Clerk to the East Sussex County Council
Brevet Colonel Gerald Noel Anstice Harris —  Royal Military Academy 
William Harrison — Chairman, Manufacturers' (Agricultural Machinery-Implements) Advisory Committee, Ministry of Munitions; Director, Messrs. Harrison Macgregor and Co., Ltd.
Lieutenant-Colonel William Edward Harrison —  Second in Command of an Engineering Training Centre
John Edwin Harston —  HM Deputy Superintending Inspector of Factories
Lieutenant-Colonel John Brunton Harstone — For an act of gallantry not in the presence of the enemy
Lieutenant-Colonel Harold Hartley  For services with the British Expeditionary Force in France
Harry Hartley —  Technical Wool Officer, War Office
William Hartree — Munitions Inventions Department
Major Stuart Hartshorn — Secretary, Ministry of National Service, East Midlands Region
Captain Geoffrey de Havilland  — Aeroplane Designer, the Aeroplane Manufacturing Company
Algernon Richard Francis Hay —  Parliamentary Department, Foreign Office
James Lawrence Hay  Secretary in charge of Young Men’s Christian Association. For work with New Zealand troops in France.
George Tolman Haycraft — Secretary, Indian Liner Conference, Ministry of Shipping
George Patrick Hayes— Superintending Civil Engineer, HM Dockyard, Devonport
Ernest Addison Stanley Hayward — Acting Assistant Director of Stores, Admiralty; late Naval Store Officer, Malta
Captain Geoffrey Head —  Secretarial Officer, Ministry of Munitions
Major Samuel Rigbye Heakes — For services, with the British Expeditionary Force in France
Captain Albert Edward Heasman — Chief Ordering and Forwarding Officer, Expeditionary Force Canteens
Meyrick William Heath — Honorary Accountant, West of England Munitions Board of Management
William Robertson Heatley —  His Britannic Majesty's Consul, Odense
Margaret Elizabeth Heaton — Commandant, Harborne Hall Auxiliary Hospital, Harborne, Birmingham
Ethel Marian Hedderwick — Convener of Red Cross Samaritan Committee and Organiser of Ladies' Committees visiting patients in Glasgow Area, Scottish Branch, British Red Cross Society
George Reginald Helmore — Assistant Director of National Service, South London and District Area
Captain Kenneth George Henderson — Member of the British War Mission to the United States of America
Rosalie Margaret Herbert — Commandant, Fairlawn Auxiliary Hospital, Honor Oak Road, Forest Hill
Roger Gaskell Hetherington — Secretary of the Works Construction Sub-Committee, War Priorities Committee
Lieutenant-Colonel Francis Esme Theodore Hewlett — Royal Air Force and Directorate of Aircraft Production
Major Edward Weston Hickes — For services with the British Expeditionary Force in France
Acting Commander William Thomas Hicks 
Dorothy Eleanor Augusta Hignett — Deputy Directress, Central Irish War Hospital Supply Depot, Irish Branch, British Red Cross Society
Lieutenant-Colonel Charles Henry Hill — Officer Commanding a Transport Workers' Battalion
Captain George Bernard Hill — For services with the British Expeditionary Force in France
Major Henry Leonard Gauntlett Hill —  Mobilization Directorate, War Office
Thomas Eustace Hill  Medical Officer of Health, County of Durham
Major Edward Langdale Hilleary — For services with British Expeditionary-Force, Salonika
Captain Arthur Mayger Hind — For services with the British Expeditionary Force in France
Frederick George Hinks — Principal Clerk, Ministry of Pensions
Commander Richard John Bayntun Hippisley  Naval Intelligence Division, Admiralty
Frank Hird — Assistant Chief Commissioner for France, Church Army
Arthur John Hodgson — Inspector of Small Arms Ammunition, Ministry of Munitions
Joseph Willoughby Hodgson  Commandant and Medical Officer in Charge, Exmouth Auxiliary Hospital, Devonshire
Captain Patrick Kirkman Hodgson — For services with the British Expeditionary Force in France
William Hogarth — Superintendent, HM Victualling Yard, Malta; Member of the Wheat Board, Malta
Major Robert Henry Hogg — Officer in charge of New Zealand Officers' Hospital, Brockenhurst
John Edward Holden — County Secretary for War Savings, Devonshire
Major Lionel Brook Holliday — Chairman, Messrs. L.B. Holliday & Co.; Manager at one of HM Factories, Ministry of Munitions
Dora Emily Susan, Lady Hollins — President of St. John Voluntary Aid Detachment Hospital, Preston
Henry Nicholls Holmes, District Secretary for Young Men’s Christian Association, France
Captain Horace Gordon Holmes — Sub-Commissioner and Accountant, British Red Cross Society, Mesopotamia
Colonel Robert Blake Worsley Holmes — Chief Mechanical Engineer, Inland Waterways and Docks, Richborough
Thomas Herbert Holt — Head of Shipping Department, Office of the Crown Agents for the Colonies
Major George Home — Officer in charge of Surgical Division, No. 2 New Zealand General Hospital
Annie Violet Honey  —  Divisional superintendent, Soldiers Award Branch, Ministry of Pensions
Major Alexander Francis Anderson Hooper — For services with the British Expeditionary Force in France
Captain Wallis Dawson Hooper — For services with the British Expeditionary Force in France
Edward William Hope  Medical Officer of Health, Liverpool
The Rev. Charles Plomer Hopkins — Honorary Treasurer of the Sailors' and Firemen's Union
John William Home — Joint Honorary Organiser, War Savings, West Riding of Yorkshire
Mabella Harriette Georgina Hoskyns —  Vice-President, Chard District, British Red Cross Society, Somersetshire
Major Henry Ralph Mowbray Howard — Assistant Inspector of Physical and Bayonet Training
Felix William Hudlass, Consulting Engineer to Motor Ambulance Department, British Red Cross Society Headquarters, London
Francis Josiah Hudleston —  Librarian, General Staff Library, War Office
Fanny Marian Hudson — Donor and Administrator, Brabyns Sail Auxiliary Hospital, Marple, Cheshire
Hilda Phoebe Hudson  Aero-Dynamics Technical Research, Aircraft Production Department, Ministry of Munitions
Phyllis May, Lady Hughes — Commandant, Munitions Canteen at a National Shell Factory
William Arthur Hyde Hulton — Director, Russo-British Shipping Co., Ltd.
John Goundrill Humphrys — Domestic Distribution Branch, Coal Mines Department, Board of Trade
Sylvia Hunloke — Stores Department — Headquarters Staff, British Red Cross Society
Jesse Brookes Hunt— Superintending Civil Engineer, HM Dockyard, Portsmouth
Alexander Hunter  Chief Medical Officer, Earl's Court Belgian Refugees Camp
Henry Norton Hutchinson — Section Director, Department of Area Organisation, Ministry of Munitions
Captain Walter Ernest Hutchinson  Marine Superintendent, British India Steam Navigation Co., Ltd.
Joyce Violet Ilbert — Collections Department  Joint War Committee, British Red Cross and Order of St. John of Jerusalem
Hugh Inglis — Assistant to the Locomotive Superintendent, North British Railway
John Iron — Commercial Harbour Master, Dover
Lieutenant-Colonel Lewis Allen Irving — Manager of the War Refugees Committee's Hostels
Captain Fullarton James — Chief Constable of Northumberland
Robert Percival James — Acting Accountant, National Health Insurance Commission (England)
Wilhelmina Martha James — Head of Red Cross Canteens, Salonika
William John James — Postmaster of Southampton
George Ernest Jeffes— Legal Adviser, Egyptian Expeditionary Force
Henry Archibald Jenkin — County Secretary for War Savings, Worcestershire, Shropshire, and Herefordshire
Major George Gaston Jessiman — Deputy Assistant Director of Supplies. War Office
Arthur Johnson — Secretary, Trading Department, Young Men’s Christian Association, Egypt
Robert Stewart Johnson — Managing Director, Messrs. Workman, Clarke and Co., Ltd., Belfast
Major Arthur Hammersley Johnston  Assistant County Director, British Red Cross Society, East Riding of Yorkshire
Joseph Johnstone  Member of the Scottish War Aims Committee
Josephine Johnstone — Commandant, Bignor Park Auxiliary Hospital, Pulborough, Sussex
Aneurin Jones — Secretary, Priority Department, Ministry of Munitions
Lieutenant-Colonel Charles Hugh le Pailleur Jones — For services with the British Expeditionary Force in France
Lieutenant David Gwilym Jones  President of Fishery Advisory Committee, Milford Haven
Ethel Mary Jones — Commandant, Budworth Hall Auxiliary Hospital, Ongar, Essex
Lieutenant Glyn Howard Howard-Jones — Ministry of National Service
Richard Evan Jones  County Director, Auxiliary Hospitals and Voluntary Aid Detachments, Cardiganshire
Tom Bruce Jones — President of the Home Grown Timber Merchants' Association of Scotland; Member of the Home Grown Timber Advisory Committee
Captain William Jones — For services with the British Expeditionary Force in France
Captain Ernest Martin Joseph — Principal Architect and Surveyor to the Navy and Army Canteen Board
Lieutenant-Colonel John Josselyn  For an act of gallantry not in the presence of the enemy
Sydney Cooper Joy —  London District Manager, Wheat Commission
Thomas Langley Judd — Assistant Controller, Munitions Accounts, Ministry of Munitions
Frederick Kahl — Assistant Director, Brewing Branch, Ministry of Food
Lieutenant-Colonel Richard Henry Keane — Officer Commanding a Transport Workers' Battalion
George Keary — Divisional Superintendent, Great Eastern' Railway
Captain John Limrick Keene — Master, Mercantile Marine
Lieutenant-Colonel Thomas Mann Keene  Secretary, Territorial Force Associations of the Counties of Denbigh and Flint
Captain Angus Keith — Master, Mercantile Marine
Hilda Margaret Catherine Kelly — Secretary, Officers' Families' Fund
William Henry Kendall — Chief Clerk to the Commissioner of Police of the Metropolis
Captain James Montagu Bowie Kennedy — Staff Captain, War Office
Chris Shotter Kent — Member of the British War Mission to the United States of America
Allen Coulter Kerr —  Foreign Trade Department. Abraham Kershaw — Chairman  and Honorary Director, Messrs. A. Kershaw & Son, Limited
Edward Bertram Hilton Kershaw — County Director, Auxiliary Hospitals and Voluntary Aid Detachments, Merionethshire
Commander Frederick William Kershaw  Harbour Master, Gravesend
John Kinahan — Representative in France of the Soldiers' Christian Association
James Scott Kincaid — Managing Director of Messrs. Kincaid & Co., Greenock
Major Guy Kindersley — For services with the British Expeditionary Force in France
The Rev. Thomas Joseph King — Senior Roman Catholic Chaplain, Australian Imperial Force
George Henry Kingston — Assistant Director of Army Contracts
Sir George, Kinloch  Appeal National Service Representative, Perthshire
Lieutenant-Colonel John Charters Kirk —  Anti-Aircraft Defences, Home Forces
Norah Kirk — Commandant, Hallgarth Auxiliary Hospital, Pickering, Yorkshire
Engineer Commander Joseph John Kirwin  Engineer Inspector, Engineer-in-Chief's Department, Admiralty
Temporary (Acting) Engineer Lieutenant-Commander Robert G. Knox  Superintending Officer, Syra Dockyard
Edith Mary Graves-Knyfton — Vice-President, Weston-super-Mare District, Somersetshire Branch, British Red Cross Society
Major Solomon James Lacey —  Royal Air Force, Barrack-master, Seaplane Station
Hugh Laing — Director, Sir James Laing & Co., Ltd., Deptford Yard, Sunderland
Andrew Lamb — Assistant to the Superintendent of the Line, Great Northern Railway
Major Malcolm Henry Mortimer Lamb  For services with the British Expeditionary Force in France
Francis Lawrence Lane — Managing Director, The Leeds Forge Co., Ltd.
William Langridge — Partner, Messrs. Gray, Dawes & Co.
Chief Engineer Claude Charles Lapsley  Chief Engineer, Mercantile Marine
Lieutenant-Colonel Edmund Larken — For services with the British Expeditionary Force in France
Emily Anne, Lady Crooke-Lawless — Honorary Superintendent, Industries and Workshops Department, Netley Hospitals
Captain John Henry Lawrence — For services with the British Expeditionary Force in France
Major Francis Bernard Lawson —  District Recruiting Officer, Hounslow
Frank Warburton Lawton— Legal Assistant, Treasury Solicitor's Department, Law Courts' Branch
Acting Commander Henry Layland  Commander of Dockyard, Dover
Captain George Edward Lea — Master, Mercantile Marine
Richard Leach, Labour Statistics Department, Ministry of Labour
Frederick Osborne Simeon Leake — Chairman, Messrs. A. V. Roe & Co., Ltd.
Joan Vera Douglas Learoyd — Assistant Controller, Queen Mary's Army Auxiliary Corps
Reginald Armitage Ledgard — Director of Accounts, Ministry of National Service
Major William Lauriston Melville Lee  — Secretary to the Oxfordshire Territorial Force Association
Ebenezer Antony Lees — Chairman, Executive Committee, Prisoners of War, British Red Cross Society, Birmingham
Vernon Francis Leese — Deputy Surveyor of the New Forest, Office of Woods
William Chambers Leete — Town Clerk, Kensington
Captain Frederick Charles Lefevre — Secretary and Organiser of Motor Service, British Red Cross Commission, Malta
Ernest John Hutchings Lemon —  Carriage and Wagon Works Manager, Midland Railway
Harry Lench  Partner, Messrs. T. W. Lench, Limited
Lieutenant Charles Bertram Lenthall 
Captain Joseph Leon — For services with the British Expeditionary Force in France
Chief Engineer Robert Leslie  Superintending Engineer, Mercantile Marine
John Bingley Garland Lester — Section Director, Allied Section, Requirements and Statistics Department, Ministry of Munitions
Major Tom Lethaby — Deputy Assistant Director of Equipment and Ordnance Stores, War Office
Captain Thomas Henry Carlton Levick —  Director, Messrs. Harris & Dixon, Ltd., Steamship Owners
Major Arthur John Lewer — Deputy Controller of Registration, Ministry of National Service, Northern Region
Lieutenant-Colonel Arthur Francis Owen Lewis  For services with the British Expeditionary Force in France
John Bebrouth Lincoln  Assistant Secretary, Central Control Board (Liquor Traffic)
William Burns Lindley — Chief Constable of Leeds City Police
Lieutenant-Colonel Henry Edith Arthur Lindsay — Staff Officer, 1st Class, Royal Air Force
The Lady Kathleen Lindsay — Lady Superintendent, Inspection Department, Woolwich, Ministry of Munitions
Engineer-Commander Alfred William Littlewood 
Joseph Millro Llewellyn — Assistant Controller, Timber Supplies Department, Ministry of Munitions
Lieutenant-Colonel Charles Lloyd  Anti-Aircraft Defences, Home Forces
Lieutenant-Colonel Ernest Herbert Lloyd — For services with the Egyptian Expeditionary Force
George William Lloyd  Assistant Director, Local Organisation Division, Food Production Department
Nathaniel Lloyd —  National Service Representative
Alexander Harper Lobban —  Late Superintendent of the Sale Branch, Patent Office
Ruth Loch — Superintendent (Female Staff), Money Order Department, General Post Office
Major Michael John Long —  Anti-Aircraft Defences, Home Forces
James Lothian — Provost  of the Burgh of Campbeltown
William Dunmore Loveday  Designer of the Wantage Crutch
Gerard Horsfall Corbett Lowe  Honorary Secretary, West Lancashire Branch, British Red Cross Society
Emily Gertrude Luce — Commandant, Malmesbury Auxiliary Hospital, Wiltshire
The Hon. Constance Ellinor Lumley — Honorary Treasurer, Young Women's Christian Association. Munition Workers Welfare Committee
Harry Lyne — Secretary in charge of an Army Area in France, Young Men’s Christian Association
Major The Hon. Neville Stephen Lytton —  For services with the British Expeditionary Force in France
Major Oliver Hugel Mabee — For services with the British Expeditionary Force in France
James Macartney — Chairman, Aircraft Fabric Committee; Member, Irish Sub-Committee, Flax Control Board
Alexander Richardson McBain — Acting Assistant Principal, Mobilisation Directorate, War Office
Antonia McClintock — Donor, Penoyre Auxiliary Hospital, Brecknockshire
Arthur John McCormack — Managing Director, Messrs. Wolseley Motors, Limited
David Edenfield McCracken — Chief Traffic Manager, Mersey Docks and Harbour Board, Liverpool
Margaret Craig, Lady McCullagh — President, Belfast Branch, Queen Mary's Needlework Guild
Hector Munro MacDonald —  Professor of Mathematics, Aberdeen University; Section Director, Labour Department, Ministry of Munitions
The Rev. Robert Gordon MacDonald —  District Secretary of an Army Area in France, Young Men’s Christian Association
Nora Mackay —  Clerk in the Prime Minister's Secretariat
John Hugh Munro Mackenzie  Member of Appeal Tribunal for the County of Argyll
Lieutenant-Colonel Tom Darke Mackie, Royal Air Force Air Service Constructional Corps
Alexander Ernest McLaren — Director of Sugar and Bread Distribution Branch, Ministry of Food
Captain John McMath — Master, Mercantile Marine
William Halliburton McMullen  Specialist Member of a Recruiting Board
Major Donald MacNaughton Macrae — For services with the British Expeditionary Force in France
William Thomas Madden — General Manager, Central Control Board (Liquor Traffic) undertaking at Enfield
Henry Ashley Madge — Wireless Telegraphy Expert, HMS Vernon.
Lieutenant William Smith Main  Master, Mercantile Marine
Edward Bellasis Wightman Maitland — Section Director, Gun Ammunition Department, Ministry of Munitions
William Whitaker Maitland— Government Secretary, Jersey
Edward Maloney — Assistant Director of Finance, Ministry of Food
Commander Joseph Man  Divisional Naval Transport Officer, Calais
Francis Oscar Mann — Section Director, Labour Department, Ministry of Munitions
Lieutenant-Colonel Henry Lattin Mansfield — For services with the British Expeditionary Force in France
Captain Ralph Sheldon Mansfield — For services with the British Expeditionary Force in France
Thomas Edward Mansfield — Chairman  of Blackburn and of Barrow Local Munitions Tribunals
Major Henry Mansford — Assistant Director of Recruiting, Hampshire Area
Major Edward William Maples  Intelligence Officer, Ministry of Reconstruction
Frank William Marillier — Manager, Carriage and Wagon Works, Great Northern Railway
Major John Lynn Marr — Assistant Director, Department of Controller-General for Merchant Shipbuilding, Admiralty
Lieutenant John Marsden — Ministry of National Service, North-Western Region
Lieutenant Arthur James Marshall— National Service Representative
Major The Hon. Reginald Hastings Marsham. Remount Service
Alfred James Martin — Clerk in the Patent Office
David Martin — Chief Investigation Officer, West Midlands Division, Ministry of Munitions
Major William Lewis Martin  Deputy Commissioner of Medical Services, Ministry of National Service, Perthshire
Hilda Martindale —  HM Senior Lady Inspector of Factories
George Stephen Maskall — Assistant Dock and Warehouse Manager, Port of London Authority
Charles James Maslin — Member, Munitions Works Board
Major James Herbert Mathias —  Instructional duties
Lieutenant-Commander Reginald Foster Pitt Maton 
Major Charles Henderson Maxwell — Sub-Commissioner for Trade Exemptions, Ministry of National Service, Scottish Region
Henry John May — Secretary, International Co-operation Alliance
Major Otway Mayne — Chief Constable of Buckinghamshire
Arthur Henry Leslie-Melville  Treasurer, North Lincolnshire Branch, British Red Cross Society
Major Robert Menzies — For services with the British Expeditionary Force in France
Thomas Arthur Merrells — Chairman, Swansea Borough Local Tribunal
Major Frank Boyd Merriman — For services with the British Expeditionary Force in France
Lieutenant-Colonel Frank Hamilton Mewburn — Canadian Army Medical Corps
Marie Louise Michell — Vice-President, Rugby Town Branch, British Red Cross Society
Sydney William Milford —  District Superintendent, London and South-Western Railway
Thomas Lodwick Miller — General Manager and Secretary, Liverpool Munitions Board of Management
Gertrude Andrews Milliken — Lady Superintendent and Assistant Honorary Secretary, Belfast Chief Depot of the Ulster Sphagnum Moss Association
Herbert Ashlin Millington — Clerk to Northamptonshire Appeal Tribunal
John Archibald Douglas Milne — Town Clerk of Shoreditch
Sarah Elizabeth Milner — Vice-President, Eckington Division, Derbyshire, British Red Cross Society
Frank Carlyle Mitchell — Deputy Head Coast Watcher, Port Isaac
Captain Peter Chalmers Mitchell 
James Moffatt — Provost  of the Burgh of Hamilton
John Moffat — Honorary Secretary, Warwickshire Branch, British Red Cross Society
Lieutenant-Colonel Thomas Anthony Monckton — Technical Officer, Royal Air Force
Loftus Balfour Moreton  Chairman, Wolverhampton Local ; Tribunal
Jules Louis Morisons — Managing Director, The General Stores and Munitions Co., Ltd.
Lieutenanti-Colonel Lyddon Chartris Morley — Officer Commanding an Officer Cadet Battalion
Lieutenant-Colonel Alfred Drummond Warrington-Morris — Staff Officer, 1st Class, Royal Air Force
Lieutenant Thomas Robertson Morris  Harbour Master, Glasgow
William Richard Morris — Controller of a Trench Warfare Factory
Sidney William Morrison — Section Director, Experimental and Technical Branch, Optical and Glassware Department, Ministry of Munitions
Captain Harold Swithun Morton — Staff Captain War Office
Andrew Moscrop — Member of the President of the Board of Agriculture's Advisory Committee on Food Production
The Rev. John Charles Moth — Temporary Chaplain to the Forces, 1st Class
Lieutenant-Colonel Alan Henry Lawrence Mount — For services with the British Expeditionary Force in France
John Percy Mountjoy — Divisional Accountant, Coal Mines Department, Board of Trade
John Moxon — Secretary, Newport Munitions Board of Management
Harry John Swenson Moyses — Manager, Birmingham Railway Carriage and Wagon Co., Ltd.
Major James Ernest Muir — Chief Inspector of Auxiliary Shipbuilding, Scotland
John Muirhead — General Manager, Messrs. Russell & Co., Port Glasgow
Captain William Percival Mulligan — For services with the British Expeditionary Force in France
Donald Munro — President of the North Scottish Timber Merchants' Association
George Frederick Muntzer — Section Director, Agricultural Machinery Department, Ministry of Munitions
Alexander Murray — Lanarkshire Local War Pensions Committee
Major William Murray — Deputy Assistant Inspector of Recruiting, Scottish Command
Horace Muspratt — Honorary Secretary, Liverpool War Savings Committee
Dudley Borron Myers — Honorary Secretary, Employment Bureau, Queen Mary's Convalescent Auxiliary Hospital, Roehampton
Lieutenant-Colonel Charles Duncan Myles — For services with the British Expeditionary Force in France
Captain William John Charles Nash — Master, Mercantile Marine
Major Colin Graham Neish  Instructional Duties
Lieutenant-Colonel Henry Nelson — For services with the British Expeditionary Force in France
William Nelson — Secretary, Lancashire Aural Board, Ministry of Pensions
Major Robert Nassau Sutton Nelthorpe  Chairman, Trent Emergency Committee
Lieutenant-Colonel Frederick William Monk Newell — For services with the British Expeditionary Force in France
John Montague Newnham  Town Clerk, Croydon
Robert Beattie Nicholson — Town Clerk, Lowestoft
Commander Richard John Noal  Marine Superintendent, Shaw, Savill & Albion Co., Ltd.
Frank Arthur Norman — Assistant Divisional Officer, London and South-Eastern Division, Ministry of Labour
Thomas Keppel North — Superintendent at one of the establishments of Messrs. Tickers, Limited
Harry Ekermans Oakley— Superintending Civil Engineer, Admiralty
Maude O'Conor — Leinster Regiment Central Advisory Committee
Violet Parry-Okeden — Vice-Presfdent, North Greenhoe Division, British Red Cross and Order of St. John of Jerusalem; Commandant, Walsingham Auxiliary Hospital, Norfolk
Percy Lane Oliver — Secretary, Camberwell Division, County of London Branch, British Red Cross Society
Captain Frederick George Orme — Inspector, High Explosives, Ministry of Munitions
Major Alfred Henry Osman
Major Alfred Lloyd Owen  For services with the British Expeditionary Force in France
Edward Tudor Owen —  First-Class Clerk, Local Government Board
John Owen —  Food Production Commissioner for North Wales
Commander Reginald Charles Lloyd Owen  Coaling Officer to Grand Fleet and Auxiliary Patrol
Staff Paymaster Reginald Douglas Paffard  Secretary to Senior Naval Officer, Harwich
Major Eric Barton Palmer — For services with the British Expeditionary Force in France
Captain Vivian Trestrail Dampier Palmer — Secretary, Ministry of National Service, South-Eastern Region
William Harold Palmer — Assistant Director, Railway Materials Department, Ministry of Munitions
Maude le Clerc Pam — Commandant, Broxbourne Auxiliary Hospital, Wormley Bury, Hertfordshire
Captain Charles Percival Parker — For services, with the British Expeditionary Force in France
Edward Parkes — Foreign Office Library
Charles de Courcy Parry — Chief Constable of Cumberland and Westmorland
Major Ernest Gambier Parry — Commandant, Goring Auxiliary Hospital, Oxfordshire
Major Robert Townshend Anwyl-Passingham — Assistant Director of Recruiting, Wrexham Area
Louise Paterson — Organiser and Founder of Mrs. Paterson's Officers' Club, France
Joseph Payne — County Secretary for War Savings, Nottinghamshire
Richard Alfred Ernest Payne — General Manager, The King's Norton Metal Co., Ltd.
Edwin Peace — Chairman, Wallasey Local Tribunal
William Herbert Peak — Secretary and Chief Accountant at one of HM Factories, Ministry of Munitions
Lieutenant-Colonel Edward Raymond Peal  Directorate of Aircraft Production, Royal Air Force
Robert John Addison Pearson —  Local Director, Messrs. Vickers, Limited
Colonel Herbert Haworth Peel — Inspector of Quarter Master-General's Services
Brevet Major Robert Peel — For services with the British Expeditionary Force, Salonika
Henrietta, Lady Beresford Peirse — Commandant, Bedale Hall. Auxiliary Hospital, Bedale, Yorkshire
Maude Katherine Pelham — Secretary, Young Women's Christian Association. War Workers' Welfare Committee
Beatrice Eleanor, Countess of Pembroke and Montgomery — Vice-President and Organiser, Wilton House Auxiliary Hospital, Salisbury
The Right Reverend Bishop Adam Urias de Pencier —  Temporary Chaplain to the Forces, attached to No. 1 Canadian General Hospital
Peter John Penney —  Naval Ordnance Store Officer, Portsmouth
Lieutenant-Colonel Thomas Edwin Perrett — Canadian Railway Troops
Captain John William Perrier — Ministry of National Service
Leonard Peskett —  Naval Architect, Cunard Steamship Co., Ltd.
Major James Patrie —  District Engineer, London, Brighton and South Coast Railway
Edith Mary Petter — Commandant of 6th Durham Voluntary Aid Detachment Hospital, Darlington
Godfrey Norris Pharazyn — Secretary, Inter-Allied Meat and Fats Executive, Ministry of Food
Lieutenant-Colonel Richard Phayre  Chief Organiser of Beachcroft Auxiliary Hospital, Woking, Surrey
James Charles Philip  Honorary Secretary of the Chemical Society
Ernest Harold Phillips —  First Class Clerk, Local Government Board
Ernest William Phillips — Principal Clerk, Royal Small Arms Factory; lately employed on Special Service in the United States
Frederick Solomon Phillips — Honorary Assistant Secretary, Ambulance Department, Order of St. John of Jerusalem; Director of Voluntary Aid Detachment Travelling and Finance Department
Lieutenant-Colonel George Percy Achilles Phillips —  Instructional Duties
Henry Percy Phillips — Honorary Secretary, Monmouthshire Belgian Refugees Committee
Lilian Marion Estelle Phillips — Vice-President, Bramley Division, British Red Cross Society; Commandant, Thorncombe Auxiliary Hospital, Bramley, Sussex
Major John Phillipson — For services with the British Expeditionary Force in France
Bertha Phillpotts —  Clerical Assistant, His Britannic Majesty's Legation, Stockholm
Major Henry Lionel Pigott —  Command Land Agent, Southern Command
Captain John Glyn Pigott — For services with the British Expeditionary Force in France
Major John Pirn — For services with the British Expeditionary Force in France
Violet May Pirn — Commandant, Grantham Auxiliary Hospital
Lieutenant-Colonel Duncan Vernon Pirie — For services with the British Expeditionary Force, Salonika
Fanny Sarah Marion Pitt — Voluntary Worker with the British Expeditionary Force in France
Isaiah Platt — Managing Director, Messrs. Samuel Platt, Limited. 
Brevet Major Charles Murray Playfair — Inspector of Carriages, Barrow and Manchester Districts, Ministry of Munitions
Captain Arthur Joscelyn Coleman Pollock — For services with the British Expeditionary Force in France
Robert Pollok —  Shipyard Manager, Messrs. Vickers, Ltd., Barrow
Walter Pott — Principal Architect, HM Office of Works
Reginald Potts — Honorary Secretary, Cheshire War Agricultural Executive Committee
Thomas Worthington Potts — Chairman, Stockport Local Tribunal
Kate Haidee Powell — Commandant, Bowden Auxiliary Hospital, Nottingham
Herbert James Bingham Powell —  Munitions Inspector in Charge of Gauge Inspection, U.S.A., Ministry of Munitions
Charles William Beeston Prescott —  Private Secretary to Director, War Trade Department
William Edward Preston — Assistant to the Chief Goods Manager, London and North Western Railway
Henry Gilbert Price — Member of the British War Mission to the United States of America
Major Robert Bateman Prust — For services with the British Expeditionary Force in France
Thomas Charles Pullinger — Managing Director, Messrs. Arrol, Johnston, Limited
Lieutenant-Colonel Richard Ireland Purdon — For services with the- British Expeditionary Force in France
William Frank Purdy — Joint Secretary of the Shipconstructors' and Shipwrights' Association
Arthur Temple Quelch —  The Manganese Bronze and Brass Co., Ltd.
Arthur Charles Quest — Acting Chief Constable, West Riding Police
Captain James Robert Rae — Master, Mercantile Marine
James Ramsay —  Plant Superintendent, Caledonian Railway
Thomas Henry Randolph — Chairman, The Wilkinson Sword Co., Ltd.
Rose Constance Ravenshaw —  Commissioner for the National War Savings Committee
The Rev. Bernard Stephen Rawlinson  Temporary Chaplain to the Forces, 1st Class
Engineer Captain Alfred Rayner  Honorary Secretary and Honorary Treasurer, Soldiers' and Sailors' Families' Association, Chatham
Lieutenant-Colonel Basil Tobin Ready —  Commanding an Officer Cadet Battalion
Captain Thomas Morley Reed — For services with the British Expeditionary Force in France
William Harvey Reeves — Assistant County Director, Auxiliary Hospitals and Voluntary Aid Detachments, Northamptonshire
Lieutenant-Colonel Percy Lester Reid — For services with the British Expeditionary Force in France
Robert Reid — Senior Engineer, Mercantile Marine
Lieutenant-Colonel Alexander Emil Jacques Reiss — Royal Air Force; Assistant Controller, Materials Branch, Aircraft Production Directorate
Walter Tapley Restall — Senior Clerk, Exchequer and Audit Department
Major John Ley Retallack — For services with the British Expeditionary Force in France
Lieutenant-Colonel Edgar Hercules Reynolds — Staff Officer for Aviation, Australia Imperial Force
Harold Bulkeley Reynolds — Manager of Plant and Machinery and Design of Plant Installation, Messrs. Babcock and Wilcox, Limited
Lieutenant-Colonel Reginald Philip Neri Reynolds — For services with the British Expeditionary Force in France
George Cobley Smyth-Richards —  Surveyor to the Devon War Agricultural Executive Committee
Captain Harold Richards — Officer Commanding New Zealand Mechanical Transport in United Kingdom
Lieutenant-Colonel Charles William Richardson — For services with the British Expeditionary Force in France
Acting Commander Sidney Sherlock Richardson  Officer in charge of Defensive Armament, Trade Division, Admiralty
Henry Riches — Chief Constable, Borough Police, Middlesbrough
Major Richard Rigg  Commissioner for the National Wai-Savings Committee
William Rintoul — Manager of the Research Section at one of the. Factories of Nobel's Explosives Company
Alfred Henry Roberts — Superintendent, Leith Docks Commission
Major Richard Cowan Roberts — Deputy Director of Recruiting, Ministry of National Service, Welsh Region
William Roberts —  Liverpool Manager, Messrs. Fred Leyland and Co.
Duncan John Robertson
James Alexander Robertson — President, Fleetwood Fishing Vessel Owners' Association
Dorothy Eyre Robinson — Assistant County Director, Auxiliary Hospitals and Voluntary Aid Detachments, Cheshire
Maurice Alexander Robinson — Head of White Sugar Branch, Sugar Commission
Samuel Robinson — Manager at one of the establishments of Messrs. Vickers, Limited
Lieutenant-Colonel Charles Herman Rogers — Officer Commanding Eastern Ontario Regimental Depot
Herbert Edwin Wright Rogers —  Metropolitan Special Constabulary
John Rogers — Assistant Director of Materials and Priority, Admiralty
John Rogers — Head of Technical Department at one of the factories of Nobel's Explosives Co., Ltd.
Colonel Alfred Shipbon Rooke — For services with the British Expeditionary Force in France
Captain William David Ross — Deputy Director of Inspection of Munitions (Administration), Ministry of Munitions
William Henry Ross — Managing Director, Distillers' Co., Ltd.
Frank de Rougemont — Sub-Commissioner, British Red Cross Society, Port Said
George John Rowe —  Workmen's Representative, Committee on Production
Margaret Lilian Rowland — County of Denbighshire Association of Voluntary Workers
Lieutenant-Colonel Francis Maude Roxby — Royal Air Force
Major Hugh Ernest Rudkin — Staff Captain, War Office
Acting Commander Henry John Montague Rundle 
George Dearie Russell — Inspector, Gun Ammunition, Filling Factories, Ministry of Munitions
Charles Tamlin Ruthen — Deputy Controller of Accommodation and Chief Inspector, HM Office of Works
George Thomas Ryder  Member, Ministry of Munitions Special Arbitration Tribunal on Women's Wages; late District Delegate of the Amalgamated Society of Engineers; Member, Birmingham Munitions Board of Management
Captain Ernest Walter Salcombe — Sub-Commissioner, British Red Cross Society, Mesopotamia
Mary Augusta Compton Salmond — Honorary Secretary, Derbyshire Branch, Incorporated Soldiers' and Sailors' Help Society
Charles Herbert Sample —  Food Production Commissioner for North of England
The Hon. Ina Sandbach — President, Montgomeryshire Branch, British Red Cross Society
Isabella Emma Sandeman — Deputy President, Brighton, Hove and Preston Division, Sussex Branch, British Red Cross Society
Ronald Leighton Sandeman — Chief Dilution Officer, Northern Division, Ministry of Munitions
2nd Lieutenant Percy Alan Sanders —  Partner, Messrs. Davey, Paxman & Co.
Major Thomas Lindsay Sandes  Officer in charge of the Surgical Division, South African Hospital, Richmond
Harold Eustace Satow  His Britannic Majesty's Consul, Larissa
Charles Skinner Satterly — County Secretary for War Savings, Lincolnshire
Jane Anne, Baroness de Saumarez — Vice-President, Ipswich Division, British Red Cross Society, Suffolk Branch
Samuel Edgar Saunders — Managing Director, Messrs. S. E. Saunders, Limited
Lieutenant-Commander Richard Say  Fleet Mail Officer
Joseph Scholes — Assistant Director of Vegetable Supplies, Ministry of Food
Louisa Leslie Florence Scott — Joint Women's Voluntary Aid Detachment Department, Devonshire House
Lieutenant-Colonel Vincent Marcus Barron Scully — For an act of gallantry not in the presence of the enemy
George Gaunt Senior —  District Goods Superintendent, Lancashire and Yorkshire Railway
Colonel The Rev. William Floyd Shannon — Senior Presbyterian Chaplain, Australian Imperial Force
Richard William Sharpies — Assistant Director, Munitions Overseas Transport, Ministry of Munitions
Edward Herbert Shaughnessy — Staff Engineer, General Post Office
Lieutenant Robert Shaw — Deputy Director of Labour Supply, Ministry of National Service, Northern Region
Montague Shearman —  HM Procurator-General's Department, Intelligence Branch
Mary Katharine, Baroness Sheffield — Vice-President, Alderley Division of Cheshire; Administrator, Alderley Park Auxiliary Hospital, Chelford, Cheshire
Walter Rider Shephard — Section Director, Mechanical Transport Department, Ministry of Munitions
Commander Carlton Collingwood Sherman  Deputy Director of Torpedo and Mines Production, Admiralty
Major Hugh Short —  New Zealand Medical Corps
Lieutenant-Colonel Cyril Ambrose Shove — Staff Officer, 1st Class, Royal Air Force
Charles William Shute —  Naval Architect, Union Castle Line
James Percy Shuter — Town Clerk, Fulham
John Frederick Sieber — Chief Clerk, Sugar Commission
Major James William Bradford Silverthorne — For services with the British Expeditionary Force in France
George Arthur Skentelbery — Manager, Blyth Shipbuilding & Dry Docks Company
Captain Donald Chipman Skinner — For services with the British Expeditionary Force in France
Major Ernest Sleight  Navy and Army Canteen Board
George Clarence Smallwood —  Secretarial Officer, Ministry of Munitions
Samuel Smiles  Assistant Professor of Chemistry, University College, London
Major David Joseph Smith  —  Directorate of Supplies and Transport, War Office
Frances Louise Kyrle-Smith — Honorary Organiser. Nottingham Hospital Supply Depot
Robert James Smith  Chairman, Cardiff Local War Pensions Committee
Sydney Edwin Smith — Assistant Controller, Munitions Accounts, Ministry of Munitions
William James Smith — Director, The Tank Storage and Carriage Company
Altamont Smythe — Lady Superintendent, Alexandria Hospital, British Red Cross Commission, Egypt
Major Frederick Wilkinson Smyth — For services with the British Expeditionary Force in France
Lieutenant-Colonel Irvine Robinson Snider —  Manitoba Regiment
Cyril Ralph Snowden — Secretary, Finance Section, Ministry of Blockade
Captain Frank Somers — Chief Engineer and Director, Messrs. Walter Somers and Co., Ltd.
Lieutenant-Colonel John Henry Willes Southey — Officer in Charge, Warwick Infantry Record Office
James Moloney Spaight  Acting Principal Clerk, Air Ministry
Lieutenant-Colonel Ralph Harold Austin-Sparks — Staff Officer, 1st Class, Royal Air Force
Commander Richard Ernest Speranza 
Benjamin Charles Spoor — In charge of Young Men’s Christian Association work in Macedonia and the Mediterranean
William Teulon Swan Stallybrass — Section Director, Priority Department, Ministry of Munitions
Ernest William Stanger — County Secretary for War Savings, Lancashire
The Hon. Adele Scudamore Stanhope — Chairman of the War Workers' Welfare Committee, Young Men’s Christian Association
Alfred Ernest Steel — Honorary Treasurer, Anglo-South-American Central Red Cross Depot
Edith Stevens — Commandant, Kempston Auxiliary Hospital, Bedford
Acting Commander Archibald Thomas Stewart  British Naval Representative at Bizerta
Percy Malcolm Stewart  Section Director, Government Rolling Mills Department, Ministry of Munitions
Henry John Scott Stobart — Managing Director, Messrs. Chance Brothers and Co., Ltd.
Jessica Octavia Stobart — Commandant, 17th Durham V.A. Hospital, Etherley, Bishop Auckland
George Herbert Stoker — Senior: Clerk, Accountant-General's Department, India Office
Gilbert Stoker — Section Director, Central Stores Department, Ministry of Munitions
Edgar Cooper Stoneham —  Accountant, Finance Department, Board of Trade
Herbert William Stovold — Assistant Director of Finance, Ministry of Food
Helena Violet Alice, Countess of Stradbroke —  Acting President, East Suffolk Branch, British Red Cross Society
Major Edward John Stuart — Inspector, Trench Warfare Stores, Ministry of Munitions
Laura Elizabeth Stuart — Joint Honorary Secretary of the Norfolk and Norwich Association of Voluntary Workers
Edith Melba Stunt — Commandant, St. Mark's Auxiliary Hospital, Tunbridge Wells
Edward Vyse Sturdy —  Parliamentary Department, Foreign Office
Leonard Sumner — Chairman  and Managing Director, The Broughton Copper Co., Ltd.
Alfred Sutro — Head of the Censorship Section, War Trade Intelligence Department
Robert Hunter Swainson — Secretary, Young Men’s Christian Association. Munitions Department
Charles Robert John Atkin Swan  Administrative Medical Officer, Royal Air Force Hospitals
Laura Beatrix Swanwick — Commandant, Bingham Hall Auxiliary Hospital, Cirencester
Lieutenant-Colonel Edward Hopton Swayne — Officer Commanding a Training Reserve Battalion
Major George Arthur Sykes — Deputy Assistant Quarter Master-General, Egyptian Expeditionary Force
Sandham John Symes — Chief Locomotive Draughtsman, Midland Railway
Major Bernard Treleaven Taperell — For services with the British Expeditionary Force in France
Bateman Brown Tarring — Works Manager at a National Filling Factory
John Taylor  President of the Dudley Trades Council
John Taylor  Provost of Clydebank
Major Thomas Alexander Hatch Taylor  For services with the British Expeditionary Force in France
David Thomas — Sub-Inspector of Schools, Cardiganshire
Ethel Thomas — Assistant Controller, Queen Mary's Army Auxiliary Corps
Farrar Wolferstan Thomas — Secretary and Accountant, Red Cross Commission, British East Africa
Jessie Thomas — Vice-President, East Lancashire Branch, British Red Cross Society!
John Frederick Ivor Thomas, Munitions Inspector, Chicago and Cleveland Districts, U.S.A., Ministry of Munitions
Joseph Silvers Williams-Thomas  Chairman, British Flint Glass Manufacturers' Association, Limited; Chairman, Messrs. Stevens & Williams, Limited
Major Archibald Henry James Thompson — Deputy Chief Valuer and Compensation Officer, Lands Directorate
Lieutenant-Commander William Peter Thompson  Marine Superintendent, Messrs. Elder, Dempster & Co.
John Thomson — General Secretary of the Associated Blacksmiths' and Ironmongers' Society
May Thorne  In charge of Sisters, Hospital and Staff Departments, Malta
Arthur Winton Thorpe — Director of Publicity, Ministry of Food
Harry Voce Thurgood — Honorary Auditor, Soldiers' and Sailors' Families' Association
Captain Norman G. Thwaites  Special duties in U.S.A
Francis Oswald Tindley — Secretary — Headquarters Trading Department, Young Men’s Christian Association
Benjamin Edward Todhunter  Managing Director, The Cotton Powder Co., Ltd.
Captain Francis Horatio Evory Townsend  For services with the British Expeditionary Force in France
Louis Tracy — Member of the British War Mission to the United States of America
Frederick Thomas Travers  Commandant and Medical Officer, Maidstone Auxiliary Hospital, Maidstone, Kent
Captain John Claude Lewis Tremayne  Assistant Director of National Service, West London and District Area
George Macaulay Trevelyan  — Commandant, Motor Ambulance Convoy No. 1, British Red Cross Commission, Italy
Lieutenant-Colonel Richard James Fynmore Trew — For services with the British Expeditionary Force in France
Wilfrid Richard Trickett— Legal Assistant, Treasury Solicitor's Department
Major Claude Henry Tritton — For services with the British Expeditionary Force in France
Harry Woodward Trotter  Committee Clerk, Board of Customs and Excise
Major John Frederick Arthur Trotter  —  For services with the British Expeditionary Force in France'
Lieutenant-Colonel Arthur Philip Hamilton Trueman — Officer Commanding an Officer Cadet Battalion
Captain Frederick William Tubb —  Marine Superintendent, Atlantic Transport Line
Major Francis Cannon Tudsbery Tudsbery — Secretary, War Office Lands and Buildings Reconstruction Committee, and Ministry of Munitions Special Committee for Lands and Buildings
Angus Alexander Gregorie Tulloch — Honorary Treasurer, East Lancashire Branch, British Red Cross Society
William Forbes Tulloch — Member of the British Commission to Holland regarding Oils and Fats
Isabel Mary Tunnard — Vice-President, Boston District, South Lincolnshire Branch, British Red Cross Society
Lieutenant-Colonel Eyre Anthony Weldon Turbett — For services with the British Expeditionary Force in France
Helen Burgess Turner  Matron of the Central Red Cross Work Rooms, Royal Academy
Miles Eaton Arundel Turner — Commercial Attache, His Britannic Majesty's Legation, Copenhagen
Captain Fred Turney — For services with the British Expeditionary Force in France
Walter Bertram Turnock — Manager, The Port Talbot Steel Co., Ltd.
William Alfred Turpin — Managing Director, Messrs. W. and G. Du Cros, Limited
Alfred Robert Turtill — Senior Staff Officer, Claims and Record Office, Kew, Ministry of Labour
Willie Jack Trevor Turton — Assistant Inspector, Local Government Board
Albert Percy Twigg — Chief Meat Supervisor, Ministry of Food
Mildred Caroline Twiss — Joint Women's Voluntary Aid Detachment Department, Devonshire House
Lieutenant Thomas Twist — Section Director, Small Arms Ammunition Department, Ministry of Munitions
Major Francis Cameron Tyler, Royal Field Arillery. Instructional duties
Major Alexander Lewis Urquhart — Royal Army Medical Corps For services with the British Expeditionary Force, Salonika
Thirza Beatrice Urwick — Secretary to Voluntary Aid Organisation and to Red Cross Work Rooms, Shropshire
Major The Hon. Osbert Eustace Vesey — For services with the British Expeditionary Force in France
William Vincent Waite — General Works Manager, Messrs. Marshall, Sons & Co., Ltd., Gainsborough
Lieutenant-Colonel Arthur Brittan Wakelin — For services with the British Expeditionary Force in France
Captain Thomas George Wakeling — President of a Recruiting Medical Board
Colonel Francis John Walker  County Director, Auxiliary Hospitals and Voluntary Aid Detachments, North Lincolnshire
Major Nigel Ouchterlony Walker —  Lands Directorate, War Office
Arthur Joseph Wall — Acting Secretary to the Prison Commissioners
Major James Hill Wallace — Canadian Young Men’s Christian Association
Captain John Wallace — Deputy Commissioner of Medical Services, Ministry of National Service
Colonel Stanier Waller  County Director, Auxiliary Hospitals and Voluntary Aid Detachments, Oxfordshire
Colonel Charles Thomas Wallis  County Director, Auxiliary Hospitals and Voluntary Aid Detachments, Monmouthshire (To be dated 21 May 1918)
Captain Harry Henden Walmsley — For services with the British Expeditionary Force in France
Commander George Augustus Crosbie Ward 
Captain Frank Warde — For services with the British Expeditionary Force in France
John Isaac de Wardt, First Class Clerk — Secretary's Office, General Post Office
Captain Robert Campbell Warden — Principal Officer, Mercantile Marine Staff, Board of Trade
David Warnock —  British Remount Commission, Canada
Major Duncan Grant Warrand — For services with the British Expeditionary Force in France
Lieutenant-Colonel Alfred Hainan Warren  Chairman of Local Tribunal, National Relief Fund, and Belgian Refugees' Committee, Poplar
Arthur Egerton Watson —  Secretarial Officer, Ministry of Munitions
Henry Watson — Director, Tredegar Dry Dock Company
John Henderson Watson — Chief Constable, City Police, Bristol
Charles Manley Watts — Assistant Director of Registration, Ministry of Food
Captain John Hunter Watts — For services with the British Expeditionary Force in France
Samuel John Wavish — Shipbuilding Manager, Messrs. Cammell, Laird and Co., Ltd.
Captain Frederick William Wayne — For services with the British Expeditionary Force, Salonika
Major Edward Clive Webb  For services with the British Expeditionary Force in France
Fleet Surgeon Alfred Ernest Weightman  Medical Department, Admiralty
Robert Anthony Ettrick Welford — Chief Investigation Officer, North-Western Division, Ministry of Munitions
The Hon. Edith Maria West — Organiser, Belgravia Red Cross Work Rooms
George Philip West — Steel Superintendent, Materials and Priority Department, Admiralty
Frederick Arthur Westlake — Assistant Chief of Section at the Central Office, Ministry of Labour
Colonel William Alexander Wetherall — County Director, Auxiliary Hospitals and Voluntary Aid Detachments, Staffordshire
Mina Ricketts Sarah Elizabeth Wethered — Honorary Secretary of the County of Gloucestershire Association of Voluntary Workers
Colonel Edward Vincent Vashon Wheeler  Chairman, Worcestershire War Agricultural Executive Committee
Herbert Edward Ogle Wheeler —  District Superintendent. South-Eastern and Chatham Railway
Clare White — General Secretary, Royal Army Temperance Association
Madge Macarthur White — Private Secretary to the Minister of Reconstruction
Captain John Hubert Whitehouse — For services with the British Expeditionary Force in France
Captain Cyprian Charles Oswald Whiteley — For services with the British Expeditionary Force in France
Martha Annie Whiteley  Research Chemist, Chemical Warfare Department, Ministry of Munitions
George Hewitt Whiteman —  Messrs. Allen, Everitt & Co., Smethwick
Roland Whitelocke Whitlock —  Marine Insurance Expert, Ministry of Food
John Whyte — Chief Engineer, Mercantile Marine
Lieutenant-Colonel John Avenal Wickham — For services with the British Expeditionary Force in France
Owen William Wightman  Assistant Director, Brewing Branch — Ministry of Food
Evelyn Caryl Bootle Wilbraham  Director, Messrs. Coley & Wilbraham. Limited
Lieutenant Albert Edward Wilcock  Coast Watching Officer
John Wilkinson, Engineer and Manager, The Nottingham Corporation Gas Works
Arthur Moray Williams — Assistant County Director, Hampshire Branch, British Red Cross Society
David Williams — Chief Constable, Cardiff City Police
Henry Owen Williams  Late Assistant Director of Contracts, Ministry of Munitions
Annie Margery Williams Mabel Catherine St. John Williams — In charge of a coffee stall with the British Expeditionary Force, France
Brevet Major Walton d'Eichthal Williams — For services with the British Expeditionary Force in France
Captain Alexander Williamson. 
Zwinglius Frank Willis — Assistant Secretary for Young Men’s Christian Association work in France
Alexander Wilson — Assistant to the General Manager, North Eastern Railway
Lieutenant-Colonel Edward Arthur Wilson  For an act of gallantry not in the presence of the enemy
Lieutenant-Colonel Francis Bertram Wilson — For services with the British Expeditionary Force in France
Frank Wilson —  Messrs. Wilson Brothers. West African Merchants
Major John Wilson — Officer Clerk, War Office Establishment
Cornelia Henrietta Maria, Dowager Baroness Wimborne —  Founder and President of the Dorset Guild of Workers
Henry Martin Winearls — Chief Clerk to the Companies Department, Board of Trade
Acting Staff Paymaster Alexander Charles Winter 
Major Harold Stephen Bigg-Wither — For services with the British Expeditionary Force in France
Amy Violet —  Wodehouse Organiser and Honorary Secretary, Prisoners of War Committee, British Red Cross Society, Worcestershire
Benjamin George Wood  Honorary Treasurer, Army and Navy Aid Committee, Sheffield
Frances Wood  Special Investigator, Central Statistical Branch, Ministry of Munitions
Fleet Surgeon Samuel Henry Woods 
Thomas Budge Work — Honorary Secretary, Orkney War Savings Committee
Alice Hill Workman — Voluntary Worker with the British Expeditionary Force in France
Margaret Elliot Workman — Voluntary Worker with the British Expeditionary Force in France
Arthur Wormald — Works Manager, Messrs. Rolls-Royce, Limited
Frances Gertrude Somers Worsley Worswick — Joint Manager of the Ampleforth Hut, Catholic Club, France
Frank Wilson Wright —  Live Stock Commissioner, N.E. Midlands, Ministry of Food
George Hudson Wright —  Engineering Manager, Messrs. Cammell, Laird & Co.
Lieutenant-Colonel Francis Joseph Caldwell Wyatt  For services with the British Expeditionary Force in France
Charles Robert Young  Secretary, Chemical Warfare Committee, Ministry of Munitions
Lieutenant-Colonel Patrick Charles Young — For services with the British Expeditionary Force in France
Major Thomas Dunlop Young — For services with the British Expeditionary Force in France
Jessie Alice Younger — Senior Organising Officer for Women's Work, Scotland, Ministry of Labour

India

John Hunter Adam — Indian Police; Personal Assistant to the Inspector-General of Police, North-West Frontier Province
Richard Percival Adams — Chief Inspector of Factories, Bengal
Dr William Albert-Briggs — Medical Missionary in Siam
John William Armstrong — Manager, New Egerton Woollen Mills, Dhariwal, Punjab
John Ashford — Public Works Department; Superintendent, Central Workshops Division, Upper Bari Doab Canal, Amritsar, Punjab
Rai Chhote Lai Bahadur — Railway Contractor, Moradabad, United Provinces
Robert George Bellairs — Tea-planter, Almora District, United Provinces
Frank Douglas Bennett — of Messrs. Wrenn, Bennett & Co., Ltd., Madras
Evelyn Blakeway — President, Ladies' Red Cross Committee, North-West Frontier Province
Thomas William Bonner — Locomotive Superintendent, Great Indian Peninsula Railway, Bombay
Rai Bahadur Sir Kailash Chandra Bose  Medical Practitioner, Calcutta
Major Ernest William Charles Bradfield  Indian Medical Service; Officer in charge of the Madras War Fund, River Hospital Ship Sikkim
John Coggin Browne — Imperial Service; Assistant Superintendent, Geological Survey of India
Francis Holy Burkitt — Executive Engineer, Irrigation (Public Works) Department, North-West Frontier Province
John Campbell, — Indian Civil Service; Deputy Commissioner of Kheri, United Provinces
William Ramage Carstairs — Chairman of the River-craft Committee, Karachi, and Managing Director, Messrs. Cosser & Co., Karachi
Dewan Tek Chand  Indian Civil Service; Barrister-at-Law; Assistant Postal Censor, Karachi
Joseph Miles Clay — Indian Civil Service; Deputy Commissioner of Garhwal, United Provinces
Alexander Cochran — Managing Director, Messrs. Burn & Co., Calcutta
Robert Denby Coggan — Manager of the Khasi Hills Prospecting and Mining Syndicate, Assam
Captain David Patrick Copeland — Recruiting Officer, at present in Military employ, Assam
Adela Cottle
Lieutenant-Colonel James Muir Crawford  Indian Medical Service, Benares, United Provinces.
Walter Erskine Crum — Major, Calcutta Light Horse. Partner, Messrs. Graham & Co., Bengal
Marjorie Stevenesson Cumming — President, Ootacamund Centre of the Madras War Fund Ladies' Depot.
Jarbanoo Dadabhoy
Rani Abhayeswari Debi —  of Bijni, Zamindar, Goalpara District, Assam
Raja Rajendra Narayan Bhanja Deo — of Kanika. Landholder, Bihar and Orissa, and an Additional Member of the Council of the Governor-General for making Laws and Regulations
Raja Brij Mohan Deo — Feudatory Chief of Kalahandi, Orissa. Nawab Malik Khuda Bakhsh Khan, Tiwana, Extra Assistant Commissioner, Punjab; now a member of the Bahawalpur State Council, Punjab
Hormusji Cowasjee Dinshaw  Senior Partner in the Firm of Messrs. Cowasjee Dinshaw and Brothers, Aden, Bombay
Archibald Alexander Dunbar-Brander — Imperial Forest Service; Divisional Forest Officer, Nimar, Central Provinces
Alfred Ezra
William Stuart Fraser — Locomotive Superintendent, Bombay, Baroda and Central India Railway, Ajmer, Rajputana
Oscar de Glanville — Barrister-at-Law; Western Sub-Divisional Magistrate, Rangoon, Burma
Joseph Ernest Goudge — Indian Civil Service; Deputy Commissioner of Sitapur, United Provinces
William David Gray — Assistant to the Financial Adviser, Military Finance, Government of India
Eustace Edward Gunter — Director, Persian Gulf Telegraphs
Ada Gurdon
Khan Bahadur Sardar Abdul Hamid — Chief Secretary to His Highness the Maharaja of Kapurthala, Punjab
Captain John Ernest Buttery Hotson — Indian Civil Service and Indian Army Reserve of Officers; Assistant for Mekran to the Political Agent in Kalat and Commandant, Mekran Levy Corps, Baluchistan
William Henry Ker Howard — Chief Engineer, Oudh and Rohilkhand Railway, Lucknow, United Provinces
William Richard Howson — His Britannic Majesty's Consul, Bunder Abbas, Persian Gulf
Major William Gordon Hutchinson — Indian Army; Political Agent, Chagai, Baluchistan
Ghazanfar Ali Khan — Indian Civil Service; Deputy Commissioner, Nimar, Central Provinces
Honorary Captain Nawab Malik Muhammad Mubariz Khan — Tiwana, Shanpur, Punjab
Dewan Shujat Ali Khan — Seoni, Central Provinces
Jehangir Hormusji Kothari — Karachi, Sind, Bombay
Surat Kunwar — of Khairagarh, District Kheri, United Provinces
Isa Charan Chandu Lai  Deputy Commissioner, Gujrat, Punjab
Elsie Margaret Lenox Conyngham
Clara, Lady Lovett — Oudh Branch of the Ladies' Association work
Brevet Lieutenant-Colonel Thomas Mawe Luke  Royal Artillery. Director of Administration, Adjutant, General's Branch, Army Headquarters
James Mackenzie — Partner of Messrs. McNeil & Co., Calcutta
Jamsetji Framji Madan — Supplier to Supply and Transport Corps, 8th (Lucknow) Division, Bengal
Richard Vivian Mansell — Partner of Messrs. James, Finlay & Co., Calcutta
Engineer Commander Archibald Anthony McDonald — Royal Indian Marine; Senior Marine Transport Officer for Coaling Duties, Bombay
Margaret Julia, Lady Miller — President, Bangalore Ladies' Branch of the British Red Cross Society and Order of St. John of Jerusalem
David James Murtrie  Deputy Director-General of the Post Office, formerly Presidency Postmaster, Bombay
James Ernest Needham — of Messrs. Purdie & Co., Freight Brokers, Bombay
Catherine, Lady Nicholson — Secretary, Coonoor Centre of the Madras War Fund Ladies' Depot
Rai Bahadur Lala Sheo Parshad  Banker and Honorary Magistrate, Delhi
Kanakarayan Tirufelvam Paul — General Secretary, Young Men’s Christian Association, Bengal
Captain Albert Gottlieb Puech  Indian Army Reserve of Officers; Assistant Recruiting Officer for Gurgaon, and Honorary Magistrate, Sirsa, Hissar District, Punjab
Frank Winckworth Austice Prideaux — Additional Judicial Commissioner, Nagpur, Central Provinces
Archibald John Pugh — (Colonel). Commandant, Calcutta Light Horse; Honorary Aide-de-Camp to His Excellency the Viceroy
Richard Stanley Purssell — Personal Assistant to the Director-General of Posts and Telegraphs, Punjab
Beatrice Reid
Major Henry Ross  Additional Assistant Director-General, Indian Medical Service, Bengal
Jotindra Nath Roy — Indian Civil Service; Collector of North Arcot District, Madras
Arthur Charles Rumboll — General Traffic Manager, Great Indian Peninsula Railway, Bombay
Nirmul Chunder Sen — Local Adviser to Indian Students in London
Raja Harihar Prasad Narayan Singh — of Amawan. Landholder, Bihar and Orissa
Rao Bahadur Thakur Hari Singh — of Sattasar. Military Member of the State Council, Bikaner, Rajputana. Rani
Sardar Raghbir Singh — of Raja Sansi. Jagirdar and Honorary Magistrate, 1st Class, Amritsar, Punjab
Risaldar Chaudhri Amar Singh — Rai Bahadur, of Pali, District Bulandshahr, United Provinces
Kumar Sheonandan Prasad Singh — Landholder, Bihar and Orissa
Oona Standen
Captain Hugh Stott  Indian Medical Service; Medical Officer on Board, the Hospital Ship, Madras
Vere Arthur Stowell — Indian Civil Service. Secretary, War Board, Lucknow, United Provinces
Walter Lancelot Travers — Captain, Northern Bengal Mounted Rifles. Manager, Baradighi Tea Estate, Western Duars: Chairman, Duars Planters' Association, Bengal
Anna Tuke
Captain Duncan Frederick Vines — Royal Indian Marine Port Officer, Calcutta
Valentine Patrick Terrell Vivian — Indian Police; Assistant Director of Central Intelligence
George Edward Campbell Wakefield — Director-General of Revenue, His Exalted Highness the Nizam's Government, Hyderabad, Deccan
Ivy Walsh — President, Patna Branch of the British Red Cross Society and Order of St. John of Jerusalem
David St. Clair Wedderburn — East Indian Railway, Locomotive Superintendent, Jamalpur, Bihar and Orissa
Alfred Lefevre Rowllings

Egypt and the Sudan
Arthur David Alban —  His Majesty's Consul at Cairo since 1903
John Ball  Chief Inspector of Geological Survey
Albert Ernest Branch — Chief Veterinary Inspector
William Hastings — Director of Hospitals in the Department of Health
Captain Charles McKey —Director of Customs, Sudan Government
Robert Earle Monteith-Smith — Assistant Director-General of Public Security and Chairman of Executive Committee, Young Men’s Christian Association, Egyptian Expeditionary Force
Charles Herbert Page — Acting Director, Steamers Department, Sudan Government
Burton Pearson — Divisional Traffic Superintendent, Egyptian State Railways
Arthur Sansome Preston —  Crown Prosecutor for Egypt and Procurator in the Alexandria Prize 
Major Robert Vesey Savile —  Reserve of Officers. Governor of Darfur Province, Sudan
Charles Todd — Principal Bacteriologist of the Department of Public Health

Honorary Officers
Sheikh Mahomed Mustafa Al-Maraghi, Grand Qadi of the Sudan

See also
1918 Birthday Honours – Full list of awards.

References

Birthday Honours
1918 awards
1918 in Australia
1918 in Canada
1918 in India
1918 in New Zealand
1918 in the United Kingdom